Chinnamasta Bhagawati also called Shakhada Bhagawati and Shakhadeswori (Nepali: छिन्नमस्ता भगवती) is a temple and Shakti Peethas in Eastern Nepal. It was established as a Siddha Peetha originally by Shaktisimhadeva in 13th century, the fifth ruler of Karnata dynasty. The temple is situated in Chhinnamasta Rural Municipality, Saptari, 10 km from Rajbiraj near the Indian border. It is the most oldest, most revered holy place and prominent worshipped place in the Saptari district.
There is a statue of the goddess inside the temple. The holy temple is one of the major temples of the country that draws thousands of devotees from Nepal and India during Bada Dashain and other festivals to worship goddess Bhagawati.

Etymology
The historical name of the temple is Sakhada Bhagawati and the place is known as Sakhada. The name 'Sakhada' is an abbreviation of the last affix of 'Shakra'. The name is derived from the King's nickname, Shakrasimhadeva who is also known as Shaktisimhadeva. In modern times, the temple is known as Chinnamasta because goddess head was missing.

History
In 1097 CE, the Karnat dynasty was established by Nanyadeva in Simraungadh. Nanyadeva, who was from Karnata left his state and ran through Pataliputra and came to stay in Bara district of Nepal. He made Nanapura, Champaran as his first capital but later he moved his capital to Simraungadh. He was accompanied by lot of his followers including Hindu priests and Kayastha community members. King Nanyadeva's fifth generation descendant was King Shaktisimhadeva aka Shakrasimhadeva (r. 1285 to 1295 CE). He was coup d'état by his general and minister Chadeshwar Thakur with the help of Think-tank council in 1295 CE.

After he was dethrone from his supremacy, he came to the present day Saptari district to live the rest of his life in Vaanaprastha (Forest Life) after handing over Kingdom to his younger son Harisimhadeva. Over time, the village was full of jungle. He cleared the dense jungle with his men to build a temple and establish his goddess deity in his name as Sakhreswari. The king's fort was nearby the temple, known as Gadhi Gaachhi locally.

The temple is locally known as Sakhra Bhagawati or Sakhreswari Bhagawati. Since the idol's severed head of the goddess Bhagwati is there, it is known as Chinnamasta Bhagawati.

Invasion 
The Tughlaq dynasty ruled the Delhi sultanate and most of Northern India from 1320 to 1413 CE. In 1324 CE, the founder of the dynasty and Sultan of Delhi, Ghiyasuddin Tughlaq turned his attention towards Bengal. They invaded Bengal and on his way back to Delhi, the ruler comes to know about Simraungadh. The Tughlaq armies cross through present-day Saptari to reach Simraungadh, which cause damage of this temple and idol of goddess Bhagawati.

Gallery

References

External links

See also

Hindu temples in Madhesh Province
Shakti Peethas
Buildings and structures in Saptari District
11th-century establishments in Nepal